Endry Cardeño is a transgender actress from Cúcuta, Colombia. Born in 1975, she has acted in several Colombian soap operas. Her most recent role was in the highly rated RCN TV telenovela, "Los Reyes" ("The Kings"). Endry also played the lead role in the 2009 Venezuelan film "Cheila, Una Casa Pa' Maita."

External links

1976 births
Living people
Colombian television actresses
People from Cúcuta
Colombian LGBT actors
Transgender actresses